K. J. Britt (born June 4, 1999) is an American football linebacker for the Tampa Bay Buccaneers of the National Football League (NFL). He played college football at Auburn.

High School career
Britt attended Oxford High School. He was the number 299th ranked recruit in the country and the number 14th ranked inside linebacker. Britt committed to Auburn over offers from Ole Miss and Georgia.

College Career
Britt received minimal playing time as a freshman and served as a rotational piece as a sophomore recording 21 total tackles. In 2019 as a junior he broke out, recording 68 total tackled and was awarded All-SEC First-team honors. As a senior, Britt missed all but two games due to a thumb injury.

Professional career

Britt was drafted by the Tampa Bay Buccaneers in the fifth round, 176th overall, of the 2021 NFL Draft. He signed his four-year rookie contract on May 13, 2021.

On October 25, 2022, Britt was placed on injured reserve. He was activated on December 10.

References

External links
Auburn Tigers bio

1999 births
American football linebackers
Auburn Tigers football players
Living people
People from Oxford, Alabama
Players of American football from Alabama
Tampa Bay Buccaneers players